Ganpati Bappa Morya is an Indian Marathi-language mythological TV series which aired on Colors Marathi. The show was produced by Mahesh Kothare under the banner of Kothare Vision. The show starred Adish Vaidya and Swaraj Yeole as Lord Ganesha. The show premiered from 24 November 2015 and stopped on 13 August 2017 completing 539 episodes.

Cast 
 Swaraj Yevale as Child Ganpati
 Adish Vaidya replaced Swaraj as Lord Ganpati
 Anlesh Desai as Mahadev Shankar
 Sayali Patil as Parvati

Reception

References

External links 
 
 Ganpati Bappa Morya at Voot

2015 Indian television series debuts
Colors Marathi original programming
Marathi-language television shows
2017 Indian television series endings